Moss Point is a cape in Aleutians West Census Area, Alaska, in the United States.

The name Moss Point was recorded by the United States Geological Survey in 1936.

References

Landforms of Aleutians West Census Area, Alaska
Headlands of Alaska